Lissocampus runa, also known as the javelin pipefish is a species of marine fish belonging to the family Syngnathidae. This species can be found in algae beds, rocky reefs, tidepools, and estuaries along the coast of southern Australia from Broken Head Nature Reserve in New South Wales to Rottnest Island, Western Australia. Their diet is thought to consist of small crustaceans such as copepods. Reproduction occurs through ovoviviparity in which the males brood eggs before giving live birth.

References

External links 

 Lissocampus runa at Fishbase
 Lissocampus runa at Fishes of Australia

Syngnathidae
Fish described in 1931